Dmitri Morozov (born 24 February 1974) is a Russian judoka.

Achievements

External links 
 

1974 births
Living people
Russian male judoka
Judoka at the 2000 Summer Olympics
Olympic judoka of Russia
Universiade medalists in judo
Universiade silver medalists for Russia
Universiade bronze medalists for Russia
Medalists at the 1995 Summer Universiade
Medalists at the 2001 Summer Universiade
21st-century Russian people